The colossal pair of marble "Horse Tamers"—often identified as Castor and Pollux—have stood since antiquity near the site of the Baths of Constantine on the Quirinal Hill, Rome. Napoleon's agents wanted to include them among the classical booty removed from Rome after the 1797 Treaty of Tolentino, but they were too large to be buried or to be moved very far. They are fourth-century Roman copies of Greek originals. They gave to the Quirinal its medieval name , which lingered into the nineteenth century. Their coarseness has been noted, while the vigor—notably that of the horses—has been admired. The Colossi of the Quirinal are the original exponents of this theme of dominating power, which has appealed to powerful patrons since the seventeenth century, from Marly-le-Roi to Saint Petersburg.

The huge sculptures were noted in the medieval guidebook for pilgrims, Mirabilia Urbis Romae. Their ruinous bases still bore inscriptions OPUS FIDIÆ and OPUS PRAXITELIS, hopeful attributions that must have dated from Late Antiquity (Haskell and Penny 1981, p 136). The Mirabilia confidently reported that these were "the names of two seers who had arrived in Rome under Tiberius, naked, to tell the 'bare truth' that the princes of the world were like horses which had not yet been mounted by a true king."

Between 1589 and 1591, Sixtus V had them restored and set on new pedestals flanking a fountain, another engineering triumph for Domenico Fontana, who had moved and re-erected the obelisk in Piazza San Pietro. In 1783-86 they were re-set at an angle, and an obelisk, which had recently been found at the Mausoleum of Augustus, was re-erected between them. (The present granite basin, which had served for watering cattle in the Roman Forum was set between them in 1818.)

An interpretation of their subject as Alexander and Bucephalus was proposed in 1558 by Onofrio Panvinio, who suggested that Constantine had removed them from Alexandria, where they would have referred to the familiar legend of the city's founder. This became a popular alternative to their identification as the Dioscuri. The popular guides still referred to their creation by Phidias and Praxiteles competing for fame, long after even the modestly learned realized that the two sculptors preceded Alexander by a century.

Other works 

About 1560 a second pair of colossal marble figures accompanied by horses were unearthed and set up on either side of the entrance to the Campidoglio.

The fame of the Horse Tamers recommended them for other situations where the ruling of base natures by higher nature was iconographically desirable. The Marly Horses made by Guillaume Coustou the Elder for Louis XV at Marly-le-Roi were re-set triumphantly in Paris at the time of the French Revolution, flanking the entrance to the Champs-Elysées In the 1640s, bronze replicas were to flank the entrance to the Louvre: moulds were taken for the purpose, but the project foundered. Paolo Triscornia carved what seem to have been the first full-scale replicas of the groups for the entrance of the Manège (the riding school of the royal guards) in St. Petersburg" (Haskell and Penny p 139). The standing of the heroic nudes had risen with the new approach to Antiquity of Neoclassicism: Sir Richard Westmacott was commissioned to cast a full-scale bronze of the "Phidias" figure, supplied with a shield and sword, as a tribute to the Duke of Wellington; it was erected at Hyde Park Corner opposite the Iron Duke's London residence Apsley House, where some French affected to think it was the Duke himself, stark naked. Christian Friedrich Tieck placed copies of the figures, in cast iron, atop Karl Friedrich Schinkel's Altes Museum, Berlin. In St Petersburg, the Anichkov Bridge has four colossal bronze Horse Tamer sculptures by Baron Peter Klodt von Urgensburg (illustration, left). In Brooklyn's Prospect Park, at the Ocean Parkway ("Park Circle") entrance, stands a pair of bronze Horse Tamers sculptures (1899) by Frederick MacMonnies, installed as the newly combined City of New York was spreading across the Long Island landscape.

Notes

References

See also 

Roman copies of Greek sculptures
Horses in art
Outdoor sculptures in Rome